Prince Regent was launched at Whitehaven in 1812. She initially sailed as a West Indiaman. Then from 1817 she made one voyage to India, sailing under a licence from the British East India Company (EIC). Afterwards, she traded across the Atlantic, primarily to the United States. She was last listed in 1839.

Career
Prince Regent first appeared in Lloyd's Register (LR) in 1812.

In June 1812, Lloyd's List reported that Prince Regent, Twentyman, master, had been on a voyage from Whitehaven to New Brunswick when she was lost in White Point Bay, Nova Scotia. In October, Lloyd's List reported that Prince Regent, Twentyman, master, had not been lost but rather had been gotten off and had come into  Liverpool, Nova Scotia.

In 1813 the British East India Company (EIC) had lost its monopoly on the trade between India and Britain. British ships were then free to sail to India or the Indian Ocean under a licence from the EIC. 

On 27 March 1818, Prince Regent, Richmond, master, sailed for Madras. On 19 April 1819 she was at Colombo when the Southwest monsoon set in. She was using iron cables with the result that the heavy seas caused her to break her windlass. She had arrived there from the Clyde on 2 April. On 25 May she was at Madras. Three days later she sailed for Bengal, which she reached on 11 June. On 10 October she sailed from Madras. On 2 January 1820 Prince Regent was at the Capel. On 23 February, when she was two days south of Scilly, Prince Regent encountered ; one of the vessels provided the other with provisions. On 10 April 1820 Prince Regent arrived at Liverpool.

In 1828 Prince Regent, Scott, master, had to put into Kingstown to repair.

Fate
Prince Regent, Burt, master, was reported to have returned from Mobile in September 1838. She was last listed in 1839, with data unchanged since 1837.

Citations

References
 

1812 ships
Age of Sail merchant ships of England
Maritime incidents in 1812